Ryan Cairns Stevenson (born 24 August 1984) is a Scottish professional footballer who played for Heart of Midlothian and St Johnstone, as well as English side Ipswich Town . He is currently manager of West of Scotland Football League side Glenafton Athletic.

Personal life
Stevenson was born in Irvine, Ayrshire, and was a boyhood Ayr United fan as stated on BBC Scotland. He was a pupil at Drongan Primary School and Kyle Academy in Ayr.

In April 2013, Stevenson was banned from driving for a period of 20 months, following being arrested for drink driving. He later apologised for the incident, stating that "I accept the consequences of my actions. I acknowledge that I am a role model for younger supporters and team-mates and as such, my serious error of judgement was not befitting of such a position."

Career

Chelsea
Stevenson began his career as a youth player at Chelsea's youth academy, staying in the same club accommodation as John Terry. Stevenson has since stated that "being a YTS at Chelsea was the best time in my life" as he was boot-boy for first-team players Jimmy Floyd Hasselbaink and Gianfranco Zola.

Stevenson played in a youth team alongside Carlton Cole, Lenny Pidgeley, Leon Knight and, in his last season, Robert Huth under the watchful eye of Manager Steve Clarke.

After making 8 reserve team appearances for Chelsea, scoring one goal, he was released in May 2002.

St Johnstone
After leaving Chelsea, Stevenson was signed for St Johnstone by Billy Stark. Stevenson made 74 league appearances for Saints, before eventually falling out of favour under Owen Coyle during 2006.

Ayr United
Robert Connor brought Stevenson home to Ayr United, the team he had supported as a boy, initially on a 28-day loan in October 2006. This loan was later extended until the end of the year. He then joined the club on a permanent basis during January 2007, for a five-figure sum, against the wishes of his St. Johnstone boss: "I have told Ryan I don't want to lose him but that I wouldn't stand in his way," Coyle told Saints' website. Just two weeks later, Stevenson scored an equaliser for Ayr United against his former club, St Johnstone, in the third round of the Scottish Cup in a 2–1 defeat. Stevenson scored the goal which promoted Ayr United to the First Division in 2009, in a 1–0 win over Airdrie United in the second leg of the First Division play-off Final at New Broomfield.

Hearts
Stevenson signed for Hearts on 1 February 2010 for an undisclosed five-figure sum, with Rocky Visconte going the other way on loan. He made his debut for Hearts on 10 February playing the full 90 minutes in a 2–0 defeat to Celtic at Celtic Park. He went on to score his first competitive goal for Hearts against Inverness Caledonian Thistle in a Scottish Premier League fixture on 18 September 2010. In the absence of Kevin Kyle, Stevenson was predominantly used as a makeshift striker and scored several notable goals, such as in wins over both halves of the Old Firm and two against Edinburgh rivals Hibernian. In June 2011 Stevenson signed a one-year contract extension to extend his stay at the club.

On 22 December 2011 with Hearts in financial difficulty and having problems paying wages Stevenson requested his contract be terminated; this was refused and Stevenson advised the club he would not play or train again until his salary was paid in full. Stevenson cited stress on his unborn baby as one of the reasons behind his decision. Despite being paid Stevenson did not return to training. Several clubs including Ayr United, Crawley Town and Dundee United were interested however Hearts were seeking £100,000 for their exiled player. Hearts pledged to open a disciplinary hearing if he did not leave during the transfer window.

Ipswich Town
On 28 January 2012, Championship side Ipswich Town announced that he was set to join them in a deal worth £50,000 which was concluded on 30 January. He was given the number 16 shirt, and had signed an 18-month contract.

Stevenson scored his first goal for Ipswich on 28 April 2012 against Doncaster Rovers on the final day of the 2011–12 Football League Championship with a long-range effort which was later voted as Ipswich Town fans Goal of the Year.

Hearts return

On 31 August 2012, after just eight months at Ipswich Town, Hearts re-signed Stevenson on a three-year contract, despite interest from Motherwell. Stevenson scored both Hearts goals in the 2013 Scottish League Cup Final, but ultimately the club lost 3–2 to St Mirren. Stevenson was released by Hearts after the club was relegated to the Scottish Championship in 2014.

Partick Thistle
Stevenson signed for Partick Thistle in June 2014 on a two-year contract, with an option for a third year. He scored his first two goals for Thistle in a 2–0 Scottish Cup win over Hamilton Academical on 29 November 2014. He scored his first and second league goals in a Scottish Premiership 4–0 away win against Inverness On 31 October 2015, Stevenson had to play as goalkeeper for the last five minutes of a 4–0 defeat to Hearts because Thistle 'keeper Ryan Scully had been sent off and Thistle had already used all of their substitutions. Stevenson's first goal of the 2015–16 season was a 90th-minute winner in a 2–1 victory over Inverness Caledonian Thistle. Stevenson was released by the club in January 2016.

Ayr United return
In December 2015, Stevenson signed a short-term loan deal with his former club Ayr United. He made three appearances for Ayr before returning to Partick Thistle. However, subsequent to his release by the Firhill side, Stevenson signed again with Ayr in January 2016, his fourth separate spell with the side. After achieving promotion to the Scottish Championship via the play-offs, Stevenson chose not to renew his contract at Somerset Park.

Dumbarton
Shortly after leaving Ayr United, Stevenson signed for Scottish Championship side Dumbarton. He scored his first goal for the club in a 3–3 draw with Peterhead in July 2016. He left the club in December 2016

Raith Rovers
He joined Raith Rovers in January 2017 Stevenson hit the headlines after being forced to play a full 90 minutes in goal, after injuries to Raith's three first team goalkeepers. Rovers lost the match 1–0 to Ayr United

In March 2017, just over a week after playing in goals, Stevenson announced his shock retirement from professional football at the age of 32 as he sought a long-term career outside of football.

Troon & Australia
After leaving Raith Rovers in March 2017 to start a long-term career outside of football, Stevenson signed for Troon.

With his personal life in turmoil, and after just one appearance and two weeks with the club, Stevenson announced he was to emigrate and he signed for Australian State League Division 2 South-East side Peninsula Strikers. However, the day he was due to leave for Australia he announced he had cancelled the agreement for family reasons.

Annan Athletic
Stevenson joined Scottish League Two side Annan Athletic in June 2017, managed by his former Ayr United teammate Peter Murphy. Stevenson managed only 8 matches before an old injury flared up & he decided to take a step back from the game to concentrate on family & work commitments.

Troon
Stevenson rejoined Troon in November 2018 after more than a year out of the game, and he said the move gave him "his love of football back" thanks to the club's Manager Jimmy Kirkwood.

The move to Portland Park proved a fruitful one for Stevenson, playing alongside former team-mates Christian Nade and Dean Keenan, and he netted 26 times in 50 appearances playing in an attacking midfield or forward role which he thrived on.

Stranraer 
With a new-found hunger for football again, Stevenson got the opportunity to return to senior football and he joined Stranraer in January 2020.

A part of the lure to Stranraer was their upcoming match against Rangers at Ibrox Park in the Scottish Cup, a possible final chance to play in front of 38,000 supporters and his family.

Troon return 
Stevenson returned to Troon for a third time in May 2020.

Albion Rovers 
In March 2021, Stevenson signed for Scottish League Two side Albion Rovers.

International call-up
On 6 November 2011, Stevenson was called up to the Scotland squad for the first time as a late inclusion for a friendly match against Cyprus.

Career statistics

Achievements 

St Johnstone
Scottish First Division: runner-up 2005–06
Scottish Challenge Cup: winner 2007–08
Ayr United
Scottish Second Division / League One (2): runner-up 2008–09, 2015–16
Scottish First Division / Championship Play-offs (2): winner 2009, 2016

Heart of Midlothian
Scottish Premier League: third-place 2010–11
Scottish League Cup: runner-up 2012–13

Notes

References

External links

 
  (2006–07 statistics)

1984 births
Living people
Association football midfielders
Scottish footballers
Chelsea F.C. players
St Johnstone F.C. players
Ayr United F.C. players
Heart of Midlothian F.C. players
Scottish Football League players
Scottish Premier League players
Ipswich Town F.C. players
Footballers from East Ayrshire
English Football League players
Scottish Professional Football League players
Partick Thistle F.C. players
Dumbarton F.C. players
Raith Rovers F.C. players
Troon F.C. players
Annan Athletic F.C. players
Outfield association footballers who played in goal
Stranraer F.C. players
Peninsula Strikers FC players
Albion Rovers F.C. players
West of Scotland Football League players